

Events

Works published
  by Bonifaci VI de Castellana, attack on Charles of Anjou
 , a pastorela by Guiraut Riquier

Births
 Cecco Angiolieri (died 1312), Italian

Deaths
26 August — Alberico da Romano (born 1196), patron and troubadour, executed
 Richard de Fournival (born 1201), a Trouvère

13th-century poetry
Poetry